Dion Dannie Leonard Sanderson (born 15 December 1999) is an English footballer who plays as a defender for  club Birmingham City, on loan from  Wolverhampton Wanderers. He previously spent time on loan at Cardiff City, Sunderland, an earlier spell at Birmingham City, and Queens Park Rangers.

Career

Wolverhampton Wanderers and loan spells
Sanderson joined Wolverhampton Wanderers' academy as an eight-year-old, signed his first professional contract in 2018, and a year later signed a two-year contract wth a 12-month option. He was a member of the senior squad for their pre-season tour of China, where he played in the club's Premier League Asia Trophy Final victory over Manchester City. He made his competitive debut on 30 October 2019 in an EFL Cup tie against Aston Villa.

Sanderson joined EFL Championship club Cardiff City on 31 January 2020 on loan to the end of the season.

Sunderland (loan)
After Sanderson's contract with Wolves was extended until 2022, he joined League One club Sunderland in October 2020 on a season-long loan. He scored his first goal for Sunderland, and his first professional goal, in a 2–0 win against Rochdale on 6 March 2021. He was cup-tied for Sunderland's victory in the 2021 EFL Trophy Final.

Near the end of April, Sanderson was ruled out for the rest of the season due to a back injury, so missed out on Sunderland's unsuccessful play-off campaign. He was voted as Sunderland's Supporters' Young Player of the Year.

Birmingham City (loan)
Sanderson signed a new four-year deal with Wolves before joining Championship club Birmingham City on 19 July 2021 on a season-long loan. He made his first-team debut for Birmingham in the EFL Cup second-round match at home to Fulham. Starting in a three-man defence alongside the experienced George Friend and fellow debutant Mitch Roberts, he played for 73 minutes before being replaced by another newcomer, Alfie Chang. He made his first league appearance on 18 September in a 3–0 defeat away to Peterborough United, replacing the injured Marc Roberts at half-time with the score 2–0, and established himself as a regular member of the starting eleven. However, on 4 January 2022, with several Wolves defenders injured or away on international duty, Sanderson was recalled on 4 January 2022.

Queens Park Rangers (loan)
Sanderson joined another Championship club, Queens Park Rangers, on 25 January 2022 on loan for the remainder of the season. He made 12 appearances, all but one in league competition.

Birmingham City (second loan)
Sanderson rejoined Championship club Birmingham City on 5 July 2022 on a season-long loan.

Personal life

He is a nephew of the 1984 Olympic javelin gold medallist Tessa Sanderson.

Career statistics

References

External links

1999 births
Living people
People from Wednesfield
English footballers
Association football defenders
Wolverhampton Wanderers F.C. players
Cardiff City F.C. players
Sunderland A.F.C. players
Birmingham City F.C. players
Queens Park Rangers F.C. players
English Football League players
Black British sportspeople